Riverside–Rialto was an interurban train service operated by the Pacific Electric Railway from 1914 to 1940, running from Downtown Los Angeles to Downtown Riverside. This was the longest service in the Pacific Electric system, and the only line to have exclusive trackage owned by the Union Pacific instead of the Southern Pacific Railroad. The line reached its highest ridership the year it opened but never recovered at a time when the Inland Empire was far less populated and a commute of that distance was rare.

History
The line was initially constructed in 1907 by the Riverside Portland Cement Company to link their new plant to the national rail network at Riverside. Operating as The Crescent City Railway Company, service was contracted out to The Riverside & Arlington Railway Company who began regular operations on May 18, 1908. The line primarily served plant workers. Riverside & Arlington would go on to be absorbed into Pacific Electric as a result of the Great Merger. The line was opened to Bloomington on March 11, 1911, and finally to Rialto on March 25, 1914. Initially only local service was provided, and passengers from Los Angeles continuing to Riverside were encouraged to take the longer trip and change at San Bernardino. 

On March 15, 1915, most local service was replaced with through trips to the Pacific Electric Building in Downtown Los Angeles. Cars were connected to San Bernardino Line trains. Between May 1921 and 1929, local cars made trips as far north as Foothill Boulevard in Rialto — the only scheduled trips to that point. All trips became through-routed to Los Angeles on November 2, 1931 as service to the cement plant was discontinued. This was short lived, as by 1935 all but one trip had been reverted to local with through routing ending entirely in 1938. Service was reduced to a single trip between Riverside and Rialto by June 9, 1940 and discontinued outright on November 18.

List of major stations

References

Pacific Electric routes
History of Los Angeles County, California
History of Riverside County, California
History of Riverside, California
Claremont, California
Covina, California
Crestmore Heights, California
El Monte, California
Fontana, California
Pomona, California
Pomona Valley
Rialto, California
San Dimas, California
Upland, California
Railway services introduced in 1908
Railway services discontinued in 1940
1908 establishments in California
1940 disestablishments in California
1920s in California
1930s in California
Closed railway lines in the United States